The Environmental Measurements Laboratory (EML) is the former name of the current National Urban Security Technology Laboratory (NUSTL), a United States government-owned, government-operated laboratory.  NUSTL is part of the Science and Technology (S&T) Directorate of the Department of Homeland Security (DHS).  Effective December 1, 2009, EML was re-designated as NUSTL to reflect the Lab’s evolved mission and functions.  NUSTL is the third name in the laboratory's history, following the Health and Safety Laboratory (HASL, 1953–1977) and the Environmental Measurements Laboratory (1977–2009).

The current Laboratory Director is Alice Hong.

As a DHS federal laboratory, NUSTL tests and evaluates technologies and systems, including those developed by DHS, other agencies, and the private sector. From its Manhattan location it uses the New York metropolitan area as an urban test bed.  Additionally, NUSTL assists New York area organizations and promotes the use of homeland security technologies and standards.

The NUSTL is located at the Federal Office Building at 201 Varick Street in SoHo, Manhattan, New York.

History 
The Manhattan Project/Atomic Energy Commission (1942–1975)

The Laboratory traces its roots to the Manhattan Project.  The lab was formed as the Medical Division of the Atomic Energy Commission (AEC) in 1947.  In 1949 it was renamed the Health and Safety Division, and in 1953, the Health and Safety Laboratory (HASL).  Fallout from nuclear weapons tests became a major concern and the lab's focus later shifted to a network of monitoring stations and measurements of radioactivity in food products.

Energy Research and Development Administration/US Department of Energy (1975–2003)

The HASL Procedures Manual became the standard for environmental radiation measurement techniques. In the 1960s, the lab began taking measurements of radon in mines to assess the health risks of miners. In the 1970s, the lab's worldwide sampling programs were expanded to include non-nuclear pollutants. In 1975 the Health and Safety Laboratory became part of the Energy Research and Development Administration, later absorbed by the US Department of Energy, and changed its name to the Environmental Measurements Laboratory (EML).

In the 1970s, the lab established the Quality Assurance Program for environmental dosimeters and radioanalytical measurements, continued work related to nuclear weapons tests, and studied radon in homes. After the Three Mile Island accident and Chernobyl disaster, the lab's work allowed reconstructing the resulting contamination.

In 1997, the lab moved to the Office of Environmental Management. EML's primary focus was to support monitoring, decommissioning, decontamination, and remediation efforts. EML served as an interface on technical issues.  EML itself also performed environmental measurements when independent expert assessments were needed. EML  continued its worldwide monitoring network and the development of instruments.

US Department of Homeland Security (2003 to present)

In 2003, EML was absorbed into the Department of Homeland Security (DHS)’s Science and Technology Directorate. In 2009 the Laboratory conducted a comprehensive Strategic Planning effort and the Laboratory’s name was changed to the National Urban Security Technology Laboratory (NUSTL).  The lab continues to test and evaluate technologies and systems addressing homeland security threats, and helps the Tri-State homeland security community.

References

External links 
 National Urban Security Technology Laboratory
 EML's Legacy Site

United States Department of Homeland Security